The 2008 Japanese motorcycle Grand Prix was the fifteenth round of the 2008 MotoGP Championship. It took place on the weekend of 26–28 September 2008 at the Twin Ring Motegi, located in Motegi, Japan.

MotoGP classification

250 cc classification

125 cc classification

Championship standings after the race (MotoGP)

Below are the standings for the top five riders and constructors after round fifteen has concluded. 

Riders' Championship standings

Constructors' Championship standings

 Note: Only the top five positions are included for both sets of standings.

References

Japanese motorcycle Grand Prix
Japanese
Motorcycle Grand Prix